Automate may refer to:
 Automation
 Automate (album), a 1998 album by Forma Tadre
 Automate (crustacean), a genus of pistol shrimp
 Automate (mythology), a Danaid in Greek mythology

See also 
 Automation (disambiguation)